Akhaltsikhe, formerly known as Lomsia, is a small city in Georgia's southwestern region (mkhare) of Samtskhe–Javakheti. It is situated on both banks of a small river Potskhovi (a left tributary of the Kura), which divides the city between the old city in the north and new in the south.

The 9th-century Akhaltsikhe (Rabati) Castle, which was recently restored, is located in the old part of the city. It is one of the main attractions of the Samtskhe-Javakheti region, along with Vardzia, Vale, Okrostsikhe and Zarzma.

Toponymy
Akhaltsikhe is the Georgian name of the town, which literally means "new fortress". It is attested in Arabic sources as Akhiskha (and Akhsikhath), in Persian as Akhesqeh (also spelled as Akheshkheh), and in Turkish sources as Ahıska.

History

The town is mentioned among the settlements conquered by general Habib ibn Maslama al-Fihri during the reign of Umayyad Caliph Mu'awiya I (661–680). During the Mongol domination of Georgia, local rulers of the House of Jaqeli, who ruled the feudal principality of Samtskhe-Saatabago, were invested with the title of atabeg and were allowed to be autonomous. In contemporaneous Persian and Turkish sources, these Jaqeli rulers were referred to as Ḳurḳūra, which derives from Qvarqvare—the name of several Jaqeli rulers.

In 1579, during the Ottoman-Safavid War (1578-1590), the Ottomans took the town. In the ensuing period, the Ottomans implanted Islam and Ottoman customs. From 1625 the town became the centre of the Akhalzik Eyalet of the Ottoman Empire known as Ahıska and it held a resident Ottoman pasha. The town rose to strategic importance and became a foremost hub of the Caucasian slave market.

In 1828, during the Russo-Turkish War of 1828–1829, Russian troops under the command of General Paskevich captured the city and, as a consequence of the 1829 Treaty of Adrianople (Edirne), it was ceded to the Russian Empire. The city initially become part of the Kutaisi Governorate, then of the Tiflis Governorate, becoming the administrative centre of the Akhaltsikhe uezd.

In the late 1980s the city was host to the Soviet Army's 10th Guards Motor Rifle Division, which became a brigade of the Georgian land forces after the fall of the Soviet Union.

Population

Climate

Archaeology

The highland environment between Akhaltsikhe and Aspindza presents a varied and complex array of archaeological features in different locations, elevations and topographies. This includes the alluvial flood-plain of the Kura River, and all the way to the high grasslands.

Human occupation is attested already in the Early Bronze Age (4th millennium BC) and later.

The Roman and medieval periods artifacts are also strongly represented in the area.

Amiranis Gora
On the northeastern outskirts of Akhaltsikhe is an important archaeological site of Amiranis Gora. It was excavated by Chubinishvili. The earliest carbon date for Amiranis Gora is 3790-3373 cal BC. It was obtained from the charcoal of the metallurgical workshop which belonged to the earliest building horizon of Amiranis Gora This indicates a division of the metallurgical production in the extractive and processing branches.

Amiranis Gora is an important reference point for the study of the Early Bronze Age Kura-Araxes culture, also known as the Early Transcaucasian Culture. The many references include the architecture, burial practices, material culture and metallurgy.

Amiranis Gora is one of the best sites with fixed stratigraphy of the Kura-Araxes culture. The carbon date for the Kura-Araxes material at Amiranis Gora is 3630-3048 cal B.C., which is very early.

People associated with Akhaltsikhe
Gregorio Pietro Agagianian (1895–1971), Patriarch of Cilicia and the Armenian Catholic Church, Cardinal, and first Eastern Catholic papabile since Cardinal Bessarion during the Renaissance
David Baazov, rabbi at Akhaltsikhe (1918)
Shio Batmanishvili, Hieromonk of the Servites of the Immaculate Conception, first Exarch of the Georgian Greek Catholic Church, and survivor of Solovki prison camp. Martyred by the NKVD during Joseph Stalin's Great Purge and buried in the mass grave at Sandarmokh in the Republic of Karelia.
Hovhannes Kajaznuni (1868–1938), first prime minister of the First Republic of Armenia
Ahmed-Pasha Khimshiashvili (?-1836), Pasha of Ahiska
Sergo Kobuladze (1909–1978), painter and illustrator
Hakob Kojoyan (1883–1959), Soviet Armenian artist
Shalva Maglakelidze, plenipotentiary for the Russian Provisional Government and then for the government of Georgia in Akhaltsikhe (1917–1918)
Stepan Malkhasyants, Armenian academician
Palavandishvili family
Giorgi Mazniashvili, governor general of Akhaltsikhe (1919–1920)
Natela Svanidze, Georgian composer
Michel Tamarati (1858–1911), Georgian Catholic priest and historian
Vakhtang Tchutchunashvili (?-1668), usurper of Imereti throne, fled to Ahiska after being deposed
Vakhtang V, King of Kartli, fled to Ahiska after a coup failure
Lusine Zakaryan (1937–1991), Soviet Armenian soprano singer

International relations

Twin towns and sister cities
Akhaltsikhe is twinned with:
 Ardahan, Turkey

See also
Battle of Akhaltsikhe
Samtskhe-Javakheti

References

Cities and towns in Samtskhe–Javakheti
Tiflis Governorate
Kura-Araxes culture